Mystical theology is the branch of theology in the Christian tradition                                                                                                                                                                                                                                                                                                                                                                                                                                                    that explains mystical practices and states, as induced by contemplative practices                                                                                                                 such as contemplative prayer, called theoria from the Greek  for contemplation.

Early Christianity

Early Alexandrian tradition
According to Origen (184/185–253/254AD) and the Alexandrian theology, theoria is the knowledge of God in creation and of sensible things, and thus their contemplation intellectually (150–400AD) (see Clement of Alexandria,  and Evagrius Ponticus). This knowledge and contemplation leads to communion with God akin to Divine Providence.

St. Macarius of Egypt
In the theological tradition of Macarius of Egypt (ca. 300–391AD) and Pseudo-Macarius, theoria is the point of interaction between God and the human in the heart of the person, manifesting spiritual gifts to the human heart.

The highest form of contemplation originates in the heart (see agape), a higher form of contemplation than that of the intellect. The concept that theoria is allotted to each unique individual by their capacity to comprehend God is consistent. This is also the tradition of theoria, as taught by St. Symeon the New Theologian (949–1022AD), that one cannot be a theologian unless one sees the hypostases of God or the uncreated light. This experience cultivates humility, meekness and the love of the human race that the Triune God has created. This invisible fire in the heart for humanity is manifest in absolute kindness and love for one's neighbor akin to selfless humility, agape or love, growing from mortification, kenosis, or epiclesis. This agape, or holy fire, is the essence of Orthodoxy.

Cappadocian tradition
In the Cappadocian school of thought (Saint Basil, Saint Gregory of Nyssa, and Saint Gregory Nazianzus) (350–400AD), theoria is the experience of the highest or absolute truth, realized by complete union with God. It is entering the 'Cloud of Unknowing', which is beyond rational understanding, and can be embraced only in love of God (Agape or Awe). The Cappadocian fathers went beyond the intellectual contemplation of the Alexandrian fathers. This was to begin with the seminal work Philokalia, which, through hesychasm, leads to Phronema and finally theosis, which is validated by theoria. One must move beyond gnosis to faith (meta-gnosis). Through ignorance, one moves beyond knowledge and being, this contemplation being theoria. In this tradition, theoria means understanding that the Uncreated cannot be grasped by the logical or rational mind, but only by the whole person (unity of heart and mind); this perception is that of the nous. God was knowable in his manifestations, but ultimately, one must transcend knowledge or gnosis, since knowledge is based on reflection, and because gnosis is limited and can become a barrier between man and God (as an idolatry). If one wishes to commune with God, one must enter into the Divine filial relation with God the Father through Jesus Christ, one in ousia with the Father, which results in pure faith without any preconceived notions of God. At this point, one can commune with God just as Moses did. Gregory of Nyssa presented as the culmination of the Christian religion the contemplation of the divine Being and its eternal Will.

Pseudo-Dionysius the Areopagite's apophaticism

Pseudo-Dionysius the Areopagite (5th to early 6th century; writing before 532), himself influenced by the Neoplatonic philosopher Proclus, had a strong impact on Christian thought and practice, both east and west. Theoria is the main theme of Dionysius’ work called "The Mystical Theology".
 Contemplative prayer is not the reserve of some elite: "rather it is that interior intimacy with God which is intended for all baptized people, to which Jesus wants to lead all his disciples, because it is his own intimacy with the Father".

The Catechism of the Catholic Church describes contemplation as "a gaze of faith, fixed on Jesus. 'I look at him and he looks at me': this is what a certain peasant of Ars used to say to his holy curé about his prayer before the tabernacle. This focus on Jesus is a renunciation of self. His gaze purifies our heart; the light of the countenance of Jesus illumines the eyes of our heart and teaches us to see everything in the light of his truth and his compassion for all men. Contemplation also turns its gaze on the mysteries of the life of Christ. Thus it learns the 'interior knowledge of our Lord', the more to love him and follow him."

Contemplative prayer is "a communion in which the Holy Trinity conforms man, the image of God, 'to his likeness'" and in it "the Father strengthens our inner being with power through his Spirit 'that Christ may dwell in (our) hearts through faith' and we may be 'grounded in love'."

Saint John Cassian the Roman, whose writings influenced the whole of Western monasticism, interpreted the Gospel episode of Martha and Mary as indicating that Jesus declared "the chief good to reside in theoria alone – that is, in divine contemplation", which is initiated by reflecting on a few holy persons and advances to being fed on the beauty and knowledge of God alone.

Saint Augustine has been cited as proving magnificently that man can only find God in the depths of his own soul: "Too late loved I Thee, O Beauty so old, yet ever new! Too late loved I Thee. And behold, Thou wert within, and I abroad, and there I searched for Thee. Thou wert with me, but I was not with Thee." The Dismissal Hymn sung in the Byzantine Rite feast of Saint Augustine, 15 June, describes him as "a wise hierarch who has received God":

He is celebrated not only as a contemplative but also as a theologian and Father of the Church, a title given to him in a document of the Fifth Ecumenical Council, held in Constantinople in 553, which declared that it followed his teaching on the true faith "in every way".  Another document of the same ecumenical council speaks of Augustine as "of most religious memory, who shone forth resplendent among the African bishops". 

Contemplation may sometimes reach a level that has been described as religious ecstasy, and non-essential phenomena, such as visions and stigmata, may sometimes though very rarely accompany it.

Contemplation and rational knowledge

The writings attributed to Saint Dionysius the Areopagite were highly influential in the West, and their theses and arguments were adopted by Peter Lombard, Alexander of Hales, Saint Albert the Great, Saint Thomas Aquinas and Saint Bonaventure. According to these writings, mystical knowledge must be distinguished from the rational knowledge by which we know God, not in his nature, but through the wonderful order of the universe, which is a participation in the divine ideas. Through the more perfect mystical knowledge of God, a knowledge beyond the attainments of reason (even when enlightened by faith), the soul contemplates directly the mysteries of divine light.

Theoria or contemplation of God is of far higher value than reasoning about God or speculative theology, its illumination prized much more than the intellectual capacity of a theologian. "Prayer cannot be reduced to the level of a means to improved understanding". Instead, contemplation is "the normal perfection of theology".

The rational exposition and explanation of Christian doctrine is the humbler task of the theologian, while the experience of contemplatives is often of a more lofty level, beyond the power of human words to express, so that "they have had to resort to metaphors, similes, and symbols to convey the inexpressible."

Theology indeed can only focus on what God is not, for instance considering God a spirit by removing from our conception anything pertaining to the body, while mysticism, instead of trying to comprehend what God is, is able to intuit it.

Notes

Subnotes

References

Sources

 
 
 
 

Christian contemplation
Christian mysticism